is a Japanese actor best known for playing Satoru Akashi/BoukenRed in the tokusatsu show GoGo Sentai Boukenger. He took part in the 20th and 21st SASUKE competition. He failed both times in the first stage.

Filmography

TV shows
Water Boys 2005 Natsu (Fuji TV, 2005)
Anego (NTV, 2005) Rugby player, episode 3
GoGo Sentai Boukenger (TV Asahi, 2006) Satoru Akashi/BoukenRed
Hanazakari no Kimitachi e (Fuji TV, 2007) Mitsuomi Daikokucho
Cho Ninja Tai Inazuma!  Sequel only (Toei Video, 2007) Hayate
Juuken Sentai Gekiranger vs. Boukenger (TV Movie, 2008) Satoru Akashi/BoukenRed
Kamen Rider OOO (episodes 17 & 18) "Sensei Masaru Hashimoto"
Gokaiger Goseiger Super Sentai 199 Hero Great Battle as Satoru Akashi
Kaizoku Sentai Gokaiger (episode 21) as Satoru Akashi
Unofficial Sentai Akibaranger (episode 3) as BoukenRed (voice)
Umechan Sensei (NHK, 2012) as Toshio Matsuoka
Seisei Suruhodo, Aishiteru (2016) as Yota Yamashita
Segodon (NHK, 2018) as Arimura Shunsai
DCU (TBS, 2022) as Toma Nishino

Films
Sanada 10 Braves (2016)

References

External links
Asai Productions Web Site
Blog

Japanese male film actors
Japanese male television actors
Living people
Male actors from Osaka
1982 births
21st-century Japanese male actors